Mateusz Garniewicz (born January 15, 1990 in Poznań, Poland) is an alpine skier from Poland. He competed for Poland at the 2014 Winter Olympics in the alpine skiing events.

References

1990 births
Living people
Olympic alpine skiers of Poland
Alpine skiers at the 2014 Winter Olympics
Polish male alpine skiers
Sportspeople from Poznań
Competitors at the 2015 Winter Universiade
21st-century Polish people